Mythology of Italy refers to the mythology of people living in Italy.

Major pantheons

Gods and Goddesses
Important Gods and Goddesses of Italian Mythology:
Aradia is the Italian Goddess of witchcraft. She protects witches (male and female) against the aggression of religious persecution and condemnation and symbolizes the air element and the moon.
Carmenta is the Goddess of spells, known for chanting incantations in verse to ease the pains of women in labor and children facing illness.
Februus is the Italian God of purification who lives in the underworld.
Fortuna is the Goddess of fate and fortune and also bringer of fertility.
Jana is the Goddess of the Moon, said to have 2 faces. One faces the past, and the other faces the future.
Jove is the Sky God. He is the equivalent of Jupiter of Roman mythology who is the King of all other Gods.
Nox is the Goddess of the night, the beginning of all things, and one of the oldest of the Gods.
Umbria is Goddess of shadows, secrets, darkness who lives in the underworld.
Cel is the Etruscan Goddess of earth. She was the mother of Giants, a race of great strength and aggression.

Cultural phenomena

Malocchio or the Evil Eye
The Evil Eye is not just a part of Italian folklore but is also present in many different cultures. Each of these cultures has its own version of the Evil Eye. However, the Evil Eye is very prominent in Italian culture and is still a common superstition today among Italians and Italian-Americans. 
The Evil Eye is a look one gives another to put bad luck upon one either causing one misfortune or causing a type of mild physical pain. This look is cast by someone typically because of jealousy and envy.
However Italian culture has two ways to counteract the Evil Eye. These are the Italian Horn, or the “Cornuto” and the “Mano Carnuto”, the hand horn. The Italian Horn is a pendant often worn on a necklace in a shape similar to a chilli. This pendant is often in gold or coral and is said to be sacred to the Moon Goddess. This is meant to ward off evil spirits as well. The “Mano Carnuto” is the formation of a hand in a fist with the pinky finger and index finger extended. This is also supposed to ward off negative vibes and the Evil Eye. Both of these counteractions are of Italian origins.

See also
Roman mythology
Etruscan mythology
Greek mythology

References

External links
 Italian Lore, Gods, Demigods, Heroes, Symbols, and Other Famous Mythological Characters
 http://www.thaliatook.com/OGOD/fauna.html
 http://www.angelfire.com/goth2/deathomen/Gods/italian_gods.htm
 http://www.godchecker.com/pantheon/roman-mythology.php?deity=FEBRUUS
 http://www.vroma.org/~araia/fortuna.html
 http://www.cosmicgoddessempowerments.com/apps/webstore/products/show/1564109http://www.lifeinitaly.com/heritage/folklore.asp
 http://www.ciaopittsburgh.com/italian-superstitions-the-evil-eye-malocchio/
 http://ottawaitalians.com/Heritage/malocchio.htm

 
Italic mythology